Michael Welch (born 21 May 1957) is a retired Barbadian/English professional footballer who played as a defender and a striker.

Career
Welch joined Wimbledon in November 1984 from non-League side Grays Athletic, playing in four Football League games before returning to Grays. In 1985, he joined Southend United from Grays. He played in five games for Southend United between February and July, when he rejoined Grays.

References

1958 births
Living people
Barbadian footballers
English footballers
Association football defenders
Association football forwards
Grays Athletic F.C. players
Wimbledon F.C. players
Southend United F.C. players
Dorking F.C. players
Tooting & Mitcham United F.C. players
Yeading F.C. players
English Football League players